Der Kommissar – The CBS Recordings is a primarily new wave music compilation album by After the Fire. Released 2005, it is essentially a reissue of the band's three album output for CBS. It is also the first time the entire collection has made it to CD, and benefits from bonus tracks associated with each of the original album recordings.

Track listing
All tracks by After the Fire

Disk 1 - Total time 79:45
Laser Love
 "Laser Love" – 3:29
 "Joy" – 3:17
 "Take Me Higher" – 4:30
 "Life in the City" – 4:01
 "Suspended Animation" – 4:21
 "Like The Power of a Jet" – 3:07
 "One Rule For You" – 3:25
 "Time To Think" – 3:29
 "Timestar" – 3:39
 "Check It Out" – 3:22
Bonus tracks - associated with "Laser Love"
 "Your Love Is Alive" (Bonus track) – 3:14
80f
 "Listen To Me" – 3:24
 "1980-F" – 2:34
 "Love Will Always Make You Cry" – 3:34
 "Can You Face It?" – 3:18
 "Who's Gonna Love You (When You’re Old And Fat And Ugly)" – 4:10
 "Starflight" – 4:18
 "Wild West Show" – 3:34
 "Billy, Billy" – 4:37
 "It's High Fashion" – 3:11
 "Why Can't We Be Friends?" – 2:51
 "Joanne" – 4:20

Disk 2 - Total time 79:34
Bonus track - associated with "80F"
 "Every Mother's Son" (Bonus track) – 2:38
Batteries not included
 "Short Change" – 3:20
 "Frozen Rivers" – 3:31
 "Sometimes" – 3:09
 "Sailing Ship" – 3:55
 "I Don't Understand Your Love" – 2:51
 "The Stranger" – 3:44
 "Rich Boys" – 3:02
 "Carry Me Home" – 3:22
 "Dancing in the Shadows" – 3:03
 "Space Walking" – 3:11
 "Gina" – 1:37
 "Stuck in Paris (Nowhere To Go)" – 2:45
 "Bright Lights" – 3:35
Bonus tracks - associated with "Batteries not included"
 "Nobody Else But You" (Bonus track) – 3:14
 "Starflight" (live) (Bonus track) – 4:51
 "Take Me Higher" (live) (Bonus track) – 7:47
 "One Rule For You" (live) (Bonus track) – 4:30
 "Billy, Billy" (live) (Bonus track) – 6:48
 "Der Kommissar" (Bonus track) – 4:08
 "Starflight" (Re-worked Bonus track) – 4:33

Personnel

Band
 Peter Banks – Hammond C3, mini Moog, Crumar Multiman, piano, vocals
 Andy Piercy – electric guitar, acoustic guitar, bass guitar, lead vocals, tambourine
 Nick Battle – bass guitar, vocals
 Ivor Twidell – drums
 John Russell – electric guitar
 Bob Price – bass guitar, electric guitar, keyboards, percussion, backing vocals
 Pete King – drums

Release details
2005, UK, Edsel MEDCD 757, released 31 January 2005, double CD (with bonus tracks)

After the Fire albums
2005 compilation albums